Francis Guy Pickering (1891 – 22 December 1966) was an English professional footballer who played as a forward.

References

1891 births
1966 deaths
Sportspeople from Burton upon Trent
English footballers
Association football forwards
Ashfield United F.C. players
Grimsby Town F.C. players
English Football League players